Count Nils Gustaf Alexander Sparre (31 May 1834  – 4 September 1914) was a Swedish politician and the fifth Speaker of Första kammaren of the Riksdag. He was married to Sophie Gustafva Sparre, daughter of Gustaf Adolf Vive Sparre and Sofia Bonde.

Biography
Sparre was born on 31 May 1834 in Norra Fågelås parish, Skaraborg County to Johan Alexander Artemis Sparre and Sofia Adelaide Rosalie Anker. He was member of the Första kammaren between 1871 and 1908 and Speaker of Första kammaren between 1896 and 1908.

References

Members of the Första kammaren
Speakers of Första kammaren
Swedish counts